Puncheon may refer to:

 Puncheon (barrel), a container for wine and/or spirits 
 Puncheon or plank road, a road built with split logs or heavy slab timbers with one face smoothed, also used for flooring or other construction
 Puncheon rum, a type of Caribbean rum
 Puncheon (unit), a unit of volume

People with the surname
 Jason Puncheon (born 1986), English footballer

See also
 Puncheon Island, Tasmania, Australia
 Puncheon Islets, Tasmania, Australia
 Puncheon Run Connector, unnumbered limited access highway in Delaware, USA